The 2009 WNBA season was the 2nd season for the Atlanta Dream of the Women's National Basketball Association. The Dream qualified for the playoffs for the first time in franchise history. However, they were eliminated by the Detroit Shock in a sweep in the first round.

Transactions

Houston Comets Dispersal Draft
With the Houston Comets ceasing operation and based on the 2008 records of teams, the Dream selected 1st in the Dispersal Draft.

WNBA Draft

Trades and Roster Changes

Roster
{| class="toccolours" style="font-size: 95%; width: 100%;"
|-
! colspan="2" style="background:#6495ED;color:white;"|2009 Atlanta Dream Roster
|- style="text-align:center; background-color:#FF0000; color:#FFFFFF;"
! Players !! Coaches
|- 
| valign="top" |
{| class="sortable" style="background:transparent; margin:0px; width:100%;"
! Pos. !! # !! Nat. !! Name !! Ht. !! Wt. !! From
|-

Depth

Schedule

|- align="center" bgcolor="bbffbb"
| 1 || May 27 || 7:00pm || Connecticut || 76-73 || de Souza, Holdsclaw (16) || de Souza (9) || Teasley (7) || Philips Arena  4,980 || 1-0
|-

Regular season

|- align="center" bgcolor="bbffbb"
| 1 || June 6 || 7:00pm || Indiana ||  || 87-86 (2OT) || Holdsclaw (23) || de Souza (17) || Holdsclaw, Teasley (4) || Philips Arena  8,709 || 1-0
|- align="center" bgcolor="ffbbbb"
| 2 || June 7 || 4:00pm || @ Washington ||  || 71-77 || Miller (17) || de Souza (6) || Lehning (4) || Verizon Center  11,759 || 1-1
|- align="center" bgcolor="ffbbbb"
| 3 || June 12 || 8:30pm || @ Chicago || CN100NBA TV || 73-81 || Castro Marques (20) || de Souza (8) || Miller (4) || UIC Pavilion  5,689 || 1-2
|- align="center" bgcolor="bbffbb"
| 4 || June 14 || 3:00pm || @ Connecticut ||  || 67-62 || Lyttle (20) || Lyttle (16) || Teasley (5) || Mohegan Sun Arena  6,429 || 2-2
|- align="center" bgcolor="bbffbb"
| 5 || June 19 || 7:30pm || Washington ||  || 93-81 || Lyttle (20) || Lyttle (13) || Teasley (4) || Philips Arena  6,050 || 3-2
|- align="center" bgcolor="ffbbbb"
| 6 || June 21 || 3:00pm || New York ||  || 81-93 || Holdsclaw (17) || Lyttle (9) || Teasley (5) || Philips Arena  5,624 || 3-3
|- align="center" bgcolor="ffbbbb"
| 7 || June 23 || 12:00pm || Chicago ||  || 98-99 (OT) || McCoughtry (26) || de Souza (7) || McCoughtry (8) || Philips Arena  10,351 || 3-4
|- align="center" bgcolor="bbffbb"
| 8 || June 26 || 7:30pm || Detroit ||  || 96-86 || Holdsclaw (28) || de Souza (13) || Teasley (11) || Philips Arena  5,935 || 4-4
|- align="center" bgcolor="ffbbbb"
| 9 || June 27 || 7:00pm || @ Connecticut ||  || 68-82 || Castro Marques (16) || Snow (9) || Lehning (4) || Mohegan Sun Arena  6,264 || 4-5
|- align="center" bgcolor="ffbbbb"
| 10 || June 30 || 7:00pm || Minnesota || ESPN2 || 85-91 || Castro Marques (31) || de Souza (10) || Lehning (4) || Philips Arena  7,686 || 4-6
|-

|- align="center" bgcolor="bbffbb"
| 11 || July 3 || 7:30pm || Washington ||  || 72-65 || Holdsclaw (18) || Lacy, Snow (8) || Holdsclaw (8) || Philips Arena  5,456 || 5-6
|- align="center" bgcolor="ffbbbb"
| 12 || July 5 || 6:00pm || @ Indiana ||  || 74-78 || Lyttle (18) || de Souza (8) || Lehning, McCoughtry (4) || Conseco Fieldhouse  7,024 || 5-7
|- align="center" bgcolor="bbffbb"
| 13 || July 7 || 7:30pm || Connecticut ||  || 72-67 || Holdsclaw (19) || de Souza (17) || Lehning (7) || Philips Arena  6,225 || 6-7
|- align="center" bgcolor="ffbbbb"
| 14 || July 11 || 7:30pm || @ New York ||  || 69-71 || Castro Marques (18) || Castro Marques, de Souza, Holdsclaw (8) || Castro Marques (6) || Madison Square Garden  8,732 || 6-8
|- align="center" bgcolor="bbffbb"
| 15 || July 15 || 1:00pm || @ Minnesota || FSN-N || 91-77 || Holdsclaw (28) || Lyttle (10) || Lehning (5) || Target Center  11,245 || 7-8
|- align="center" bgcolor="ffbbbb"
| 16 || July 17 || 7:00pm|| @ Indiana ||  || 79-84 || de Souza (23) || de Souza (14) || Castro Marques, Lehning (3) || Conseco Fieldhouse  7,975 || 7-9
|- align="center" bgcolor="ffbbbb"
| 17 || July 19 || 4:00pm || @ New York ||  || 86-89 || Holdsclaw (26) || de Souza (10) || de Souza (3) || Madison Square Garden  8,560 || 7-10
|- align="center" bgcolor="bbffbb"
| 18 || July 22 || 12:00pm || @ Detroit ||  || 98-95 (OT) || Latta (22) || Snow (12) || Holdsclaw (4) || Palace of Auburn Hills  14,439 || 8-10
|- align="center" bgcolor="bbffbb"
| 19 || July 30 || 7:30pm || Phoenix ||  || 106-76 || McCoughtry (17) || de Souza (14) || Lehning (5) || Philips Arena  7,827 || 9-10
|-

|- align="center" bgcolor="bbffbb"
| 20 || August 1 || 7:00pm || New York || NBA TVMSG || 89-83 || Holdsclaw (18) || Holdsclaw, Lyttle (7) || Latta, Lehning (3) || Philips Arena  6,103 || 10-10
|- align="center" bgcolor="bbffbb"
| 21 || August 6 || 8:00pm || @ San Antonio ||  || 92-84 || Holdsclaw (21) || Lyttle (10) || Lehning (7) || AT&T Center  5,042 || 11-10
|- align="center" bgcolor="ffbbbb"
| 22 || August 8 || 7:00pm || Chicago ||  || 80-82 || Latta (18) || de Souza (15) || Latta, Miller (3) || Philips Arena  5,424 || 11-11
|- align="center" bgcolor="bbffbb"
| 23 || August 13 || 7:30pm || Detroit ||  || 80-75 || Castro Marques (16) || de Souza (13) || Lehning (5) || Philips Arena  5,641 || 12-11
|- align="center" bgcolor="bbffbb"
| 24 || August 15 || 7:00pm || Seattle ||  || 88-79 || Lyttle (20) || de Souza (12) || Lehning (6) || Philips Arena  8,751 || 13-11
|- align="center" bgcolor="bbffbb"
| 25 || August 20 || 7:30pm || San Antonio ||  || 93-87 || McCoughtry (34) || de Souza (11) || Lehning (6) || Philips Arena  5,848 || 14-11
|- align="center" bgcolor="ffbbbb"
| 26 || August 23 || 3:00pm || Los Angeles ||  || 87-91 || Castro Marques (26) || de Souza (9) || Castro Marques, Lehning (4) || Philips Arena  11,304 || 14-12
|- align="center" bgcolor="bbffbb"
| 27 || August 25 || 7:30pm || Sacramento ||  || 103-83 || Castro Marques (30) || Lyttle (9) || Lehning (10) || Philips Arena  5,159 || 15-12
|- align="center" bgcolor="ffbbbb"
| 28 || August 27 || 7:30pm || @ Detroit ||  || 83-87 || Castro Marques (19) || de Souza (13) || McCoughtry (5) || Palace of Auburn Hills  5,695 || 15-13
|- align="center" bgcolor="ffbbbb"
| 29 || August 29 || 10:00pm || @ Seattle ||  || 84-91 (2OT) || McCoughtry (16) || Lyttle (11) || Lehning, McCoughtry (4) || KeyArena  9,089 || 15-14
|-

|- align="center" bgcolor="bbffbb"
| 30 || September 1 || 10:30pm || @ Los Angeles ||  || 84-79 || Castro Marques (27) || de Souza, Lyttle (7) || de Souza, Latta (3) || STAPLES Center  8,756 || 16-14
|- align="center" bgcolor="bbffbb"
| 31 || September 4 || 10:00pm || @ Sacramento ||  || 98-90 || de Souza (27) || de Souza (13) || McCoughtry (10) || ARCO Arena  6,517 || 17-14
|- align="center" bgcolor="ffbbbb"
| 32 || September 5 || 10:00pm || @ Phoenix ||  || 82-100 || de Souza (23) || Snow (7) || Lehning (10) || US Airways Center  10,424 || 17-15
|- align="center" bgcolor="bbffbb"
| 33 || September 11 || 7:00pm || Connecticut  ||  || 88-64 || McCoughtry (18) || de Souza (14) || Lyttle (5) || Philips Arena  8,644 || 18-15
|- align="center" bgcolor="ffbbbb"
| 34 || September 12 || 7:00pm || @ Washington ||  || 64-82 || McCoughtry (19) || McCoughtry (13) || Castro Marques, de Souza (3) || Verizon Center  11,987 || 18-16
|-

| All games are viewable on WNBA LiveAccess

Postseason

|- align="center" bgcolor="ffbbbb"
| 1 || September 16 || 8:00pm || @ Detroit || ESPN2 || 89-94 || Castro Marques (25) || Lyttle (9) || Castro Marques (7) || Palace of Auburn Hills  6,122 || 0-1
|- align="center" bgcolor="ffbbbb"
| 2 || September 18 || 7:30pm || Detroit || NBA TV || 79-94 || Latta (21) || de Souza (7) || McCoughtry, Latta, Price (3) || Gwinnett Arena  4,780 || 0-2
|-

Standings

Playoffs

Statistics

Regular Season

Playoffs

Awards and Honors

References

External links

Atlanta Dream seasons
Atlanta
Atlanta Dream